Stage 7 is a 30-minute American TV drama anthology series that was broadcast on CBS from December 12, 1954, through September 25, 1955. This program premiered in December 1954 with the title Your Favorite Playhouse with all episodes being repeats from other series, but later featured original episodes.

Don Rickles's first dramatic appearance on TV was in the May 15, 1955, episode, "A Note of Fear". Other actors who appeared on the program included Dennis Morgan, Charles Bronson, Edmond O'Brien, Gene Barry, Phyllis Coates, Frances Rafferty, Macdonald Carey, and Phyllis Thaxter.

The program was filmed in Hollywood, with Warren Lewis as producer. Some directing was done by Quinn Martin.

When Stage 7 went into syndication, in some parts of the United States sponsors changed the title to indicate their sponsorship. The first to do so was Standard Oil of California, which used the name Chevron Hall of Stars in its markets. Drewry's Beer signed Don Ameche as host and changed the title to Don Ameche Presents the Drewry's Play of the Week in its 11 market areas in the Midwest.

Episodes
Episode 1: The Deceiving Eye
Episode 2: Appointment in Highbridge
Episode 3: The Legacy
Episode 4: Debt of Honor - February 20, 1955
Episode 5: Tiger at Noon
Episode 6: To Kill a Man
Episode 7: The Greatest Man in the World
Episode 8: The Press Conference
Episode 9: The Long Count
Episode 10: Down from the Stars
Episode 11: Young Girl in an Apple Tree
Episode 12: Emergency
Episode 13: The Magic Hat
Episode 14: Armed
Episode 15: Billy and the Bride
Episode 16: A Note of Fear - May 15, 1955
Episode 17: The Verdict
Episode 18: The Time of the Day
Episode 19: Yesterday's Pawnshop
Episode 20: The Traveling Salesman
Episode 21: End of the Line
Episode 22: Debt to a Stranger
Episode 23: Where You Loved Me
Episode 24: The Hayfield
Episode 25: The Fox Hunt

References

External links 
at CVTA with episode list
 
 Stage 7
 Episode The Time of the Day at the Internet Archive

1950s American drama television series
1950s American anthology television series
1955 American television series debuts
1955 American television series endings
CBS original programming
Black-and-white American television shows